Bayer 04 Leverkusen bounced back from the nearly disastrous season it came from, finishing in the top three and qualifying for the UEFA Champions League in the process. The season marked the breakthrough for Bulgarian striker Dimitar Berbatov, who scored 16 goals, whereas Brazilian signing França contributed with 14 strikes. As it was, it was the attack that impressed the most, especially in the 6–2 crushing of champions Werder Bremen on the penultimate day of the season.

Players

First-team squad
Squad at end of season

Left club during season

Results

Bundesliga
 Bayer Leverkusen-Freiburg 4–1
 1–0 Robson Ponte 
 1–1 Sascha Riether 
 2–1 Lúcio 
 3–1 Juan 
 4–1 Oliver Neuville 
 Eintracht Frankfurt-Bayer Leverkusen 1–2
 1–0 Nico Frommer 
 1–1 Bernd Schneider 
 1–2 Geri Cipi 
 Bayer Leverkusen-Hannover 4–0
 1–0 França 
 2–0 Oliver Neuville 
 3–0 Oliver Neuville 
 4–0 Daniel Bierofka 
 Bochum-Bayer Leverkusen 1–0
 1–0 Tomasz Zdebel 
 Bayer Leverkusen-Hamburg 1–0
 1–0 Juan 
 Bayern Munich-Bayer Leverkusen 3–3
 0–1 Carsten Ramelow 
 1–1 Roy Makaay 
 1–2 França 
 2–2 Roque Santa Cruz 
 3–2 Michael Ballack 
 3–3 Yıldıray Baştürk 
 Wolfsburg-Bayer Leverkusen 0–1
 0–1 Bernd Schneider 
 Bayer Leverkusen-Hansa Rostock 3–0
 1–0 Diego Placente 
 2–0 Dimitar Berbatov 
 3–0 Daniel Bierofka 
 Hertha Berlin-Bayer Leverkusen 1–4
 0–1 França 
 1–1 Fredi Bobić 
 1–2 Dimitar Berbatov 
 1–3 Bernd Schneider 
 1–4 Marko Babić 
 Bayer Leverkusen-Mönchengladbach 1–0
 1–0 Bernd Schneider 
 Kaiserslautern-Bayer Leverkusen 0–0
 Bayer Leverkusen-Schalke 04 3–1
 1–0 Dimitar Berbatov 
 1–1 Mike Hanke 
 2–1 Marko Babić 
 3–1 Daniel Bierofka 
 Borussia Dortmund-Bayer Leverkusen 2–2
 1–0 Salvatore Gambino 
 2–0 Salvatore Gambino 
 2–1 Oliver Neuville 
 2–2 Marko Babić 
 Bayer Leverkusen-1860 Munich 2–2
 0–1 Danny Schwarz 
 0–2 Markus Schroth 
 1–2 Robson Ponte 
 2–2 Lúcio 
 Köln-Bayer Leverkusen 0–0
 Bayer Leverkusen-Werder Bremen 1–3
 0–1 Aílton 
 0–2 Mladen Krstajić 
 1–2 Jens Nowotny 
 1–3 Krisztián Lisztes 
 Stuttgart-Bayer Leverkusen 2–3
 0–1 Carsten Ramelow 
 0–2 Dimitar Berbatov 
 1–2 Kevin Kurányi 
 1–3 Dimitar Berbatov 
 2–3 Zvonimir Soldo 
 Freiburg-Bayer Leverkusen 1–0
 1–0 Roda Antar 
 Bayer Leverkusen-Eintracht Frankfurt 1–2
 0–1 Ingo Hertzsch 
 1–1 Oliver Neuville 
 1–2 Ioannis Amanatidis 
 Hannover-Bayer Leverkusen 2–2
 1–0 Clint Mathis 
 2–0 Kostas Konstantinidis 
 2–1 Dimitar Berbatov 
 2–2 França 
 Bayer Leverkusen-Bochum 1–3
 0–1 Martin Meichelbeck 
 0–2 Dariusz Wosz 
 1–2 Dimitar Berbatov 
 1–3 Mamadou Diabang 
 Hamburg-Bayer Leverkusen 3–1
 1–0 Nico-Jan Hoogma 
 2–0 Mehdi Mahdavikia 
 3–0 Bernardo Romeo 
 3–1 Bernd Schneider 
 Bayer Leverkusen-Bayern Munich 1–3
 0–1 Roy Makaay 
 0–2 Michael Ballack 
 0–3 Roy Makaay 
 1–3 Bernd Schneider 
 Bayer Leverkusen-Wolfsburg 4–2
 1–0 Dimitar Berbatov 
 2–0 Marko Babić 
 2–1 Marko Topić 
 3–1 Bernd Schneider 
 4–1 França 
 4–2 Diego Klimowicz 
 Hansa Rostock-Bayer Leverkusen 0–2
 0–1 Dimitar Berbatov 
 0–2 Marko Babić 
 Bayer Leverkusen-Hertha Berlin 4–1
 0–1 Marcelinho 
 1–1 Dimitar Berbatov 
 2–1 França 
 3–1 França 
 4–1 Dimitar Berbatov 
 Mönchengladbach-Bayer Leverkusen 0–0
 Bayer Leverkusen-Kaiserslautern 6–0
 1–0 Timo Wenzel 
 2–0 Dimitar Berbatov 
 3–0 Teddy Lučić 
 4–0 França 
 5–0 Yıldıray Baştürk 
 6–0 França 
 Schalke 04-Bayer Leverkusen 2–3
 0–1 Dimitar Berbatov 
 1–1 Michael Delura 
 1–2 Bernd Schneider 
 1–3 Hans-Jörg Butt 
 2–3 Mike Hanke 
 Bayer Leverkusen-Borussia Dortmund 3–0
 1–0 Marko Babić 
 2–0 França 
 3–0 Dimitar Berbatov 
 1860 Munich-Bayer Leverkusen 1–1
 1–0 Paul Agostino 
 1–1 Bernd Schneider 
 Bayer Leverkusen-Köln 2–0
 1–0 Clemens Fritz 
 2–0 França 
 Werder Bremen-Bayer Leverkusen 2–6
 0–1 França 
 0–2 Daniel Bierofka 
 0–3 França 
 1–3 Mladen Krstajić 
 2–3 Aílton 
 2–4 França 
 2–5 Dimitar Berbatov 
 2–6 Oliver Neuville 
 Bayer Leverkusen-Stuttgart 2–0
 1–0 Dimitar Berbatov 
 2–0 Bernd Schneider

Statistics

Topscorers
  Dimitar Berbatov 16
  França 14
  Bernd Schneider 9
  Oliver Neuville 6

Kits

References

Notes

Bayer 04 Leverkusen seasons
Bayer Leverkusen